The journal At-Tabib (“The doctor“) was edited between 1884 and 1885 by the Lebanese linguist and journalist Ibrāhīm al-Yāziǧī (1847-1906) as well as by Bišāra Zalzal (1851-1905) and Ḫalīl Saʿāda. In total, they published 24 numbers in one year in Beirut, coming out every two weeks.  The predecessor of At-Tabib, Ahbār Tibbiya (“medical notifications”), had already been founded in 1874 by George E. Post (1838-1909). Being a member of the American Mission in Beirut as well as a professor at the Medical School of the Syrian Protestant College (nowadays the American University of Beirut, AUB), post created a medical journal for the College's students. After taking over the post of editor in chief, al-Yāziǧī changed it into an encyclopedic educational publication that now bore the subtitle Maǧalla ṭibbīya ʿilmīya ṣināʿīya and was guided by the examples of Al-Jinan and Al-Muqtataf. The content of its articles was medical, scientific, literary and linguistic.  Even though he failed with At-Tabib, it was only some years later that al-Yāziǧī published two other periodicals in Cairo: Al Bayan and Ad-Diya.

References

Further reading
 
 Dagmar Glaß. (2004). Der al-Muqtaṭaf und seine Öffentlichkeit. Aufklärung, Räsonnement und Meinungsstreit in der frühen arabischen Zeitschriftenkommunikation, Band I+II, Würzburg: Ergon Verlag.

1884 establishments in the Ottoman Empire
1885 disestablishments in the Ottoman Empire
Arabic-language magazines
Biweekly magazines
Defunct magazines published in Lebanon
Magazines established in 1884
Magazines disestablished in 1885
Magazines published in Beirut
Medical magazines